The 1912 Washington and Lee Generals football team represented Washington and Lee University as a member of the South Atlantic Intercollegiate Athletic Association (SAIAA) during the 1912 college football season. Led by James Reilly in his first and only year as head coach, the Generals compiled an overall record of 8–1 with a mark of 3–1 in SAIAA play. Ted Shultz was the only freshman to make the varsity this season. Shultz and captain Buck Miles were the tackles, a duo which "scintillated."

Schedule

References

Washington and Lee
Washington and Lee Generals football seasons
Washington and Lee Generals football